Hatred is an isometric shoot 'em up video game developed and published by Destructive Creations that was released on June 1, 2015 for Microsoft Windows. The player character is a misanthropic mass-killer who begins a "genocide crusade" to kill as many human beings as possible. The developer described Hatred as a reaction to video game aesthetic trends such as political correctness, politeness, vivid color, and games as art. Its October 2014 announcement trailer was characterized as "controversial" by multiple video game journalists. The game was shortly removed by Valve from their Steam Greenlight service due to its extremely violent content but was later brought back with a personal apology from Gabe Newell. It was greenlit for a second time on December 29, 2014 and released on June 1, 2015.

Upon release, Hatred received generally negative reviews in video game press. Critics panned the game for being repetitive and lacking variation, criticizing its violent and controversial nature, although some minor praise went towards its gameplay mechanics.

Despite the reception, Hatred developed a cult following and has been described as a cult video game.

Gameplay 

Hatred is a shooter game presented in an isometric perspective in which the player character and protagonist is a mass-murdering villain who "hates this world, and the human worms feasting on its carcass" and embarks on a "genocide crusade" against the entire human race. The player can carry three weapons and an assortment of grenades, as well as drive some vehicles. Health is regenerated by performing glory kills on incapacitated people; the moves made to kill those victims involve cinematic switches of camera perspectives.

If the player is killed, the level restarts entirely unless the player completed additional sidequests that provide a limited number of respawn points. The character's voice acting is deliberately kept to a minimum, with his ideology and motivations largely left open to interpretation.

Plot 
The plot of Hatred revolves around a man only known as "The Antagonist". Disgusted by human society and general existence, the Antagonist decides to commit a "one-way trip" spree of killings in New York City using his arsenal of weapons.

Travelling from his neighbourhood to 1 Police Plaza, the man kills dozens of civilians and NYPD officers, prompting a government response. After escaping the police by train, he devises a plan to carry out his mission of committing suicide and killing millions of people by blowing up a nuclear power plant near the city. To accomplish this, he needs a Composition C plastic explosive, which he gets by storming the Fort O'Connor military base, wiping out the entire base before heading to the power plant.

He manages to enter the nuclear power plant and plants the explosive on the nuclear reactor. He then attempts to overload the nuclear reactor using the security system. Whether he succeeds or fails, soldiers arrive and shoot him multiple times in the chest while he laughs. As he dies, he activates the explosive trigger; the power plant explodes, levelling New York City and killing millions of people.

Development 

Hatred is the first game by Destructive Creations, a video game developer based in Gliwice, Poland. Most of the company's staff previously worked at another Polish developer, The Farm 51.

Destructive Creations announced Hatred on October 16, 2014, releasing the game's controversial trailer. The developer described Hatred as a reaction to a trend of political correctness in video games, and sought to make a game that eschewed politeness, colorfulness, and games as art. In this way, they sought to make a game that recalled the industry's history as "a rebellious medium" and surface-level entertainment with no insertion of "any fake philosophy". While the trailer was intended to be provocative, Destructive Creations CEO Jarosław Zieliński did not anticipate the large reaction and the amount of supportive fan mail. He added that he did not think the trailer crossed a moral boundary, and that those who disagreed could choose to not play it. In an interview with Vice Motherboard, Zieliński noted that the dark ambient music within the game as well as the character design were intentionally made to be devoid of joy, stating that "I don’t want to justify anything. I want the player to ask: why." The game uses the Unreal Engine 4 game engine and Nvidia PhysX physics. The Unreal logo was removed from the trailer at the request of the engine's developer, Epic Games.

The player character's dialogue was written by Herr Warcrimer, vocalist for Polish black metal band Infernal War and Industrial Blackened death metal band Iperyt; the song "Particular Hatred" by Iperyt appears in the game. The voice for the player character was provided by a voice-over actor using the pseudonym "Clint Westwood"; Zieliński claimed the actor "wanted to stay anonymous". Instrumental songs from Norwegian death metal band Blood Red Throne also appear in the soundtrack.

The team chose to work on a single platform due to the team's small size, hoping to distribute the game through Steam and GOG.com if allowed. On December 15, 2014, Hatred briefly appeared on Steam Greenlight, but was removed, with a Steam representative stating that the company "would not publish Hatred". On December 16, the game was returned to the service, and an apology to the development team was sent by Gabe Newell. Following this, it became the most voted game on the service and was approved successfully on December 29.

On April 11, 2020, Destructive Creations announced that they would be porting the game to the Nintendo Switch. It is unclear whether the game will be released in its uncensored form as Nintendo, like Sony and Microsoft, has a policy of not licensing or selling AO-rated games for its video game systems.

Marketing
In January 2015, Hatred was given an "Adults Only" (AO) rating by the Entertainment Software Rating Board (ESRB). The rating effectively prevents any mainstream retail distribution of the game in the United States, or on video game consoles as all three major console manufacturers forbid AO-rated games on their platforms. It is the third video game that received an AO rating for extreme violence rather than sexual content, behind Manhunt 2 and the unreleased Thrill Kill. Hatred is also the only game to be rated AO and have no sexual content at all. One of its developers disputed the rating, stating that they were "not quite convinced" about the rating due to its association with sexually explicit games, adding that "it's still some kind of achievement to have the second game in history getting AO rating for violence and harsh language only. Even if this violence isn't really that bad and this harsh language isn't overused."

A second trailer was released the same month, along with pre-order details. It showed new weapons (such as a flamethrower) and new execution animations. Developers claimed that shortly after the release, developer tools for Hatred would be made available. The release date was announced in April 2015.

The game was released on June 1, 2015. Shortly before the game's release, Twitch announced a ban on all AO-rated games, making it one of the few prohibited games on the streaming platform. The first set of additional downloadable content, titled Survival, was released in September 2015, for free on Steam. The content adds three new maps for Survival mode, three new playable characters, "Story" and "Insane" difficulty modes, new sidequests, new rank systems, new leaderboards and new achievements. The content contains the ability to use several cheat options, including unlimited ammunition, "God mode", and all weapons unlocked.

On October 22, 2019 the game received new DLC by way of a spin-off comic book series in conjunction with Behemoth Comics. The books are periodically released digitally on Steam individually or in a bundle with the game.

Reception

Pre-release 
Several video game press outlets responded negatively to the game's announcement trailer, particularly in condemnation of its "portrayal of wanton violence". Polygon Colin Campbell wrote that the site's staff responded to the game's first trailer "with genuine revulsion". They described the trailer as "grisly", "extremely violent, and very tacky". PC Magazine David Murphy wrote to "get ready for the backlash about the ultra-violent shooter ... if this game is ever released". He compared the game to Manhunt, Postal, and Mortal Kombat—other video games considered controversial for their amount of violence—and felt that Hatred "will generate just as much controversy". The trailer attracted defense of the game's right to freedom of expression, but Polygon reported that no outlet requested censorship of the game.

Rafał Pankowski, sociologist and co-founder of the "Never Again" Association, analyzed the political associations of the development team, which according to Pankowski shows many connections to the radical right which are troubling.

Polygon Ben Kuchera wrote that the trailer was a "rhetorical failure" in that it attempted to shock viewers, but ultimately reflected the 1990s "shock culture" aesthetic. In response, Zieliński said that the trailer's "so called 'shock tactic' [did] its job very well", and added that the industry reaction to the trailer reflected the political correctness—"the way we are told and taught to think"—that the game's existence sought to oppose. When questioned about links between the company and the right-wing nationalist group Polska Liga Obrony (Polish Defence League) based on a public Facebook like, Destructive Creations responded that they did not support the organization, were against "totalitarian ideologies", and appreciated the publicity despite its malevolence.

The second trailer, titled Devastation, received similar criticism, with Polygon calling it "just as vicious and cynical as the first trailer". The Guardian, Rock, Paper, Shotgun and Kotaku described Hatred as a "mass murder simulator".

Post-release 
Hatred received generally negative reviews. It holds an aggregated score of 43/100 on Metacritic based on 46 reviews.

GameSpot gave Hatred a score of 3 out of 10, noting that the game's novelty wore off quickly due to a lack of variation or "thrilling five-star moment[s]", and concluding that "the fact that the final product fails even to be worth a primal psychotic scream of victory against society at large for the people it might encourage means it laughably fails even at being dangerous." Similarly, Jim Sterling, while criticizing the tone, concluded that "worse than that—we got a damn boring game". Rock, Paper, Shotgun said that "Hatred fails in every way", claiming the game falls short in terms of entertainment, technical competence, and "to be a controversial, shocking experience". Chris Carter of Destructoid was also critical of one-note gameplay while noting several technical issues.

Softpedia praised the game's mechanics, calling the game "a good twin-stick shooter that manages to offer an interesting experience only through the actual theme". IGN Italy praised the game's shooting mechanics and visuals component, but criticized its repetitiveness and poor artificial intelligence; likewise IGN Spain praised the game's visuals and scenario's destructibility but panned its A.I. and poor plot.

Upon launch, Hatred quickly became a best seller on Steam, and it holds a "Very Positive" response on the site.

References

External links 
 

2015 video games
Censored video games
Genocide in fiction
Mass murder in fiction
Indie video games
Monochrome video games
Obscenity controversies in video games
Shoot 'em ups
Single-player video games
Steam Greenlight games
Unreal Engine games
Video games set in New York City
Video games set in 2015
Video games developed in Poland
Video games using PhysX
Video games with isometric graphics
Windows games